Boophis mandraka is a species of frog in the family Mantellidae.
It is endemic to Madagascar, officially known only from Mandraka Park with unconfirmed records in Andohahela National Park, Ambatovaky Reserve, Anjanaharibe-Sud Reserve and Andasibe-Mantadia National Park.
Its natural habitats are subtropical or tropical moist montane forests, rivers, and heavily degraded former forest.
It is threatened by habitat loss for agriculture, timber extraction, charcoal manufacturing, invasive eucalyptus, livestock grazing and expanding human settlement.

References

mandraka
Endemic frogs of Madagascar
Amphibians described in 1979
Taxonomy articles created by Polbot